In Greek mythology, Scylla is a legendary monster who lives on one side of a narrow channel of water, opposite her counterpart Charybdis. The two sides of the strait are within an arrow's range of each other—so close that sailors attempting to avoid Charybdis would pass dangerously close to Scylla and vice versa.

Scylla is first attested in Homer's Odyssey, where Odysseus and his crew encounter her and Charybdis on their travels. Later myth provides an origin story as a beautiful nymph who gets turned into a monster.

Book Three of Virgil's Aeneid associates the strait where Scylla dwells with the Strait of Messina between Calabria, a region of Southern Italy, and Sicily. The coastal town of Scilla in Calabria takes its name from the mythological figure of Scylla and it is said to be the home of the nymph.

The idiom "between Scylla and Charybdis" has come to mean being forced to choose between two similarly dangerous situations.

Parentage

The parentage of Scylla varies according to author. Homer, Ovid, Apollodorus, Servius, and a scholiast on Plato, all name Crataeis as the mother of Scylla. Neither Homer nor Ovid mentions a father, but Apollodorus says that the father was either Trienus (probably a textual corruption of Triton) or Phorcus (a variant of Phorkys). Similarly, the Plato scholiast, perhaps following Apollodorus, gives the father as Tyrrhenus or Phorcus, while Eustathius on Homer, Odyssey 12.85, gave the father as Triton, or Poseidon and Crateis as the parents.

Other authors have Hecate as Scylla's mother. The Hesiodic Megalai Ehoiai gives Hecate and Apollo as the parents of Scylla, while Acusilaus says that Scylla's parents were Hecate and Phorkys (so also schol. Odyssey 12.85).

Perhaps trying to reconcile these conflicting accounts, Apollonius of Rhodes says that Crataeis was another name for Hecate, and that she and Phorcys were the parents of Scylla. Likewise, Semos of Delos says that Crataeis was the daughter of Hecate and Triton, and mother of Scylla by Deimos. Stesichorus (alone) names Lamia as the mother of Scylla, possibly the Lamia who was the daughter of Poseidon, while according to Gaius Julius Hyginus, Scylla was the offspring of Typhon and Echidna.

Narratives 
According to John Tzetzes and Servius' commentary on the Aeneid, Scylla was a beautiful naiad who was claimed by Poseidon, but the jealous Nereid Amphitrite turned her into a terrible monster by poisoning the water of the spring where Scylla would bathe.

A similar story is found in Hyginus, according to whom Scylla was loved by Glaucus, but Glaucus himself was also loved by the goddess sorceress Circe. While Scylla was bathing in the sea, the jealous Circe poured a baleful potion into the sea water which caused Scylla to transform into a frightful monster with six dog forms springing from her thighs. In this form, she attacked Odysseus' ship, robbing him of his companions.

In a late Greek myth, recorded in Eustathius' commentary on Homer and John Tzetzes, Heracles encountered Scylla during a journey to Sicily and slew her. Her father, the sea-god Phorcys, then applied flaming torches to her body and restored her to life.

Homer's Odyssey

In Homer's Odyssey XII, Odysseus is advised by Circe to sail closer to Scylla, for Charybdis could drown his whole ship: "Hug Scylla's crag—sail on past her—top speed! Better by far to lose six men and keep your ship than lose your entire crew." She also tells Odysseus to ask Scylla's mother, the river nymph Crataeis, to prevent Scylla from pouncing more than once. Odysseus successfully navigates the strait, but when he and his crew are momentarily distracted by Charybdis, Scylla snatches six sailors off the deck and devours them alive.

Ovid's Metamorphoses

According to Ovid, the fisherman-turned-sea god Glaucus falls in love with the beautiful Scylla, but she is repulsed by his piscine form and flees to a promontory where he cannot follow. When Glaucus goes to Circe to request a love potion that will win Scylla's affections, the enchantress herself becomes enamored with him. Meeting with no success, Circe becomes hatefully jealous of her rival and therefore prepares a vial of poison and pours it into the sea pool where Scylla regularly bathed, transforming her into a thing of terror even to herself.
{|
|
In vain she offers from herself to run 
And drags about her what she strives to shun.|} The story was later adapted into a five-act tragic opera, Scylla et Glaucus (1746), by the French composer Jean-Marie Leclair.

Keats' Endymion
In John Keats' loose retelling of Ovid's version of the myth of Scylla and Glaucus in Book 3 of Endymion (1818), the evil Circe does not transform Scylla into a monster but merely murders the beautiful nymph. Glaucus then takes her corpse to a crystal palace at the bottom of the ocean where lie the bodies of all lovers who have died at sea. After a thousand years, she is resurrected by Endymion and reunited with Glaucus.

Paintings

At the Carolingian abbey of Corvey in Westphalia, a unique ninth-century wall painting depicts, among other things, Odysseus' fight with Scylla. This illustration is not noted elsewhere in medieval arts.

In the Renaissance and after, it was the story of Glaucus and Scylla that caught the imagination of painters across Europe. In Agostino Carracci's 1597 fresco cycle of The Loves of the Gods in the Farnese Gallery, the two are shown embracing, a conjunction that is not sanctioned by the myth. More orthodox versions show the maiden scrambling away from the amorous arms of the god, as in the oil on copper painting of Fillipo Lauri and the oil on canvas by Salvator Rosa in the Musée des Beaux-Arts de Caen.

Other painters picture them divided by their respective elements of land and water, as in the paintings of the Flemish Bartholomäus Spranger (1587), now in the Kunsthistorisches Museum, Vienna. Some add the detail of Cupid aiming at the sea-god with his bow, as in the painting of Laurent de la Hyre (1640/4) in the J. Paul Getty Museum and that of Jacques Dumont le Romain (1726) at the Musée des beaux-arts de Troyes. Two cupids can also be seen fluttering around the fleeing Scylla in the late painting of the scene by J. M. W. Turner (1841), now in the Kimbell Art Museum.

Peter Paul Rubens shows the moment when the horrified Scylla first begins to change, under the gaze of Glaucus (c.1636), while Eglon van der Neer's 1695 painting in the Rijksmuseum shows Circe poisoning the water as Scylla prepares to bathe. There are also two Pre-Raphaelite treatments of the latter scene by John Melhuish Strudwick (1886) and John William Waterhouse (Circe Invidiosa, 1892).

 Explanatory notes

 Citations  

 General and Cited References 
 Apollodorus, Apollodorus, The Library, with an English Translation by Sir James George Frazer, F.B.A., F.R.S. in 2 Volumes. Cambridge, MA, Harvard University Press; London, William Heinemann Ltd. 1921.  Online version at the Perseus Digital Library.

 Campbell, David A., Greek Lyric III: Stesichorus, Ibycus, Simonides, and Others, Harvard University Press, 1991. .
 Fowler, R. L., Early Greek Mythography: Volume 2: Commentary, Oxford University Press, 2013. .
 Gantz, Timothy, Early Greek Myth: A Guide to Literary and Artistic Sources, Johns Hopkins University Press, 1996, Two volumes:  (Vol. 1),  (Vol. 2).
 Hanfmann, George M. A., "The Scylla of Corvey and Her Ancestors" Dumbarton Oaks Papers 41 "Studies on Art and Archeology in Honor of Ernst Kitzinger on His Seventy-Fifth Birthday" (1987), pp. 249–260. 
 Hyginus, Gaius Julius, Fabulae, in The Myths of Hyginus, edited and translated by Mary A. Grant, Lawrence: University of Kansas Press, 1960. Online version at ToposText.
 Most, G.W., Hesiod: The Shield, Catalogue of Women, Other Fragments, Loeb Classical Library, No. 503, Cambridge, Massachusetts, Harvard University Press, 2007, 2018. . Online version at Harvard University Press.
 
 Stesichorus, in Greek Lyric, Volume III: Stesichorus, Ibycus, Simonides, and Others. Edited and translated by David A. Campbell. Loeb Classical Library 476. Cambridge, MA: Harvard University Press, 1991.
 Virgil, Aeneid''. Translated by Frederick Ahl: Oxford University Press, 2007.

External links

 – references in classical literature and ancient art.

Characters in the Odyssey
Female legendary creatures
Monsters in Greek mythology
Mythical many-headed creatures
Mythological hybrids
Characters in the Argonautica
Metamorphoses in Greek mythology
Nereids
Children of Apollo
Sea monsters